Collingwood Park may refer to:

 Collingwood Park, Queensland, Australia
 Collingwood Park Australian Football Club, a football club in Queensland, Australia
 Collingwood Park, Western Australia
 Collingwood Park (stadium)
 Collingwood Park, New Jersey, United States